The 1962 Vanderbilt Commodores football team represented Vanderbilt University as a member of the Southeastern Conference (SEC) during the 1962 NCAA University Division football season. Led by Art Guepe in his tenth and final season as head coach, the Commodores compiled an overall record of 1–9 with a mark of 1–6 conference play, placing 11th in the SEC.

Schedule

References

Vanderbilt
Vanderbilt Commodores football seasons
Vanderbilt Commodores football